Fernando Azevedo e Silva (born 4 February 1954) is a Brazilian politician and reserve army general. He served as the Brazilian Minister of Defence during the first half of President Jair Bolsonaro's term from January 2019 to March 2021.

He graduated as Infantry Officer on December 14, 1976, at the Academia Militar das Agulhas Negras, and was promoted to Army general (four stars rank) on July 31, 2014.

He was assistant to Supreme Federal Court Chief Justice Dias Toffoli. On 13 November 2018, he was named by President-elect Jair Bolsonaro as his choice for Minister of Defence, replacing previous nominee Augusto Heleno, who was instead named as head of the Institutional Security Office. On March 29, 2021, Azevedo resigned, along with the five other ministers.

References

Living people
1954 births
Politicians from Rio de Janeiro (city)
Brazilian generals
Defence ministers of Brazil